Aniba percoriacea is a species of plant in the family Lauraceae. It is endemic to Suriname.

References

Flora of Suriname
percoriacea
Vulnerable plants
Endemic flora of Suriname
Taxonomy articles created by Polbot